Lwyncelyn is a village in Ceredigion, Wales, situated on the A487 trunk road approximately  southwest of the town of Aberaeron and  northeast of the village of Llanarth. The village forms part of the community of Henfynyw with most of the village situated along the A487 trunk road and the unclassified road leading to the nearby hamlet of Oakford, Ceredigion (Derwen Gam).

Location
The Ceredigion coastline is  miles away at the small shingle beach at Gilfach yr Halen. There are two small rivers running through Llwyncelyn. The Afon Cwinten to the North, and Avon Drywi to the South of the village.

Amenities
The village has a petrol station with a convenience store and post office situated on the northern side of the A487, an animal feed store, a small home furnishing store, a farm shop and restaurant as well as a small chapel with cemetery, a village hall and a small caravan and camping park as well as a second camping site. There is also a nearby karting track.

Chapel
Llwyncelyn Welsh Independent chapel and chapel hall, along with the adjacent cemetery are situated on Rhydfach (the unclassified road running from the A487 to Oakford). The chapel was built in 1855 and became a Grade II listed building in 1964.

Village Hall
The memorial hall/village hall (Llwyncelyn Neuadd y Pentref) is situated off the A487 and contains plaques in honour of local men who died in the two world wars. The building has two meeting rooms, each with a capacity of twenty.

A defibrillator is located on the outside wall of the building.

Education
The local primary school (Penlôn) opened in 1878 and was closed in 2011 following a decline in student numbers from a high of 59 in 2006 to the review threshold of 20 in 2010 resulting in running costs per pupil being approximately 50% higher than the average for Ceredigion. The school buildings were sold off and were converted into a residential property. The nearest primary school is now in Aberaeron, as is the nearest secondary school

Public transport
The village is serviced by the TrawsCymru T5 bus services from Cardigan to Aberystwyth. The nearest train stations are in Aberystwyth and Haverfordwest.

Gallery

References 

Villages in Ceredigion